15th parallel may refer to:

15th parallel north, a circle of latitude in the Northern Hemisphere
15th parallel south, a circle of latitude in the Southern Hemisphere